Conner Peripherals, Inc. (commonly referred to as Conner), was a company that manufactured hard drives for personal computers. Conner Peripherals was founded in 1985 by Seagate Technology co-founder and San Jose State University alumnus Finis Conner (1943– ). In 1986, they merged with CoData, a Colorado start-up founded by MiniScribe founders Terry Johnson and John Squires. CoData was developing a new type of small hard disk that put the capacity of a 5.25-inch drive into the smaller (and now commonplace) 3.5-inch format. The CoData drive was the first Conner Peripherals product.  The company was partially financed by Compaq, who was also a major customer for many years.

Hard disks

Design concepts

Conner's drives were notable for eschewing the "tub" type of head-disk assembly, where the disks are inside a large base casting shaped like a square bowl or vault with a flat lid; instead, they preferred the flat base plate approach, which was more resistant to shock and less likely to warp or deform when heated. Their first drives had the base plate carrying the disks, head arm and actuator enclosed inside a long aluminum cartridge, fixed to a bulkhead on the other side with two screws and sealed with a large, square O-ring. Conner's 1/3-height (1-inch thick) drives used a domed, cast aluminum lid with four screws, one on each corner, sealed to the base plate with a rubber gasket. The printed circuit board was bolted to the bottom of the base plate, with the mounting holes for the drive drilled into tabs cast into the sides of the base plate. This design would be Conner's trademark look well into the 1990s.

Logically, Conner's drives had some of the characteristics of the original MiniScribe drives (of which John Squires had also been a designer), with a large amount of intelligence built into the drive's central processing unit (CPU); Conner drives used a single Motorola 68HC11 microcontroller, and ran a proprietary real-time operating system that implemented the track-following algorithms (the "servo" system) in software, as well as managing the bus interface. Running these functions in software saved a lot of hardware; in 1986, most drives used a separate PID controller for the spindle, and used a CPU mainly to manage the bus interface and generate positioning pulses for a stepper motor. SCSI support added yet another CPU to interpret the SCSI commands, and track-following servos required analog components that often populated entire circuit boards of their own, thus driving up costs.

Another cost-saving measure was the ability of the drive to test itself when it was initially powered on after being assembled in the factory.  Unlike many competitive products, this required only a power connection, not a dedicated computer or test system.

Performance issues and the "Chinook" dual-actuator drive

Conner products suffered from lower performance compared to drives that had more on-board buffer memory, or those that spun the media at speeds greater than 3600 RPM, and lower capacity compared to products that utilized zone bit recording (ZBR), to which Conner was slow to adapt. To remedy this, Conner produced a limited number of dual-actuator drives (internally called "Chinook") for high-throughput applications.  These drives used the SCSI interface and had two independently controlled (by the embedded microprocessor) servo and read/write systems, and two complete sets of read/write heads.  The drive firmware enabled it to dynamically reorder commands and assign them to a specific read/write system for optimum execution time, and perform read-write-verify and read-exclusive or-write operations twice as fast as comparable single-actuator systems.

Chinook was limited by its physical size — internally it used 3.5-inch disks, but the external dimensions were those of much higher-capacity 5.25-inch drives. Also, RAID systems that used standard drives were dropping in price, making it simpler to use many single-actuator drives with higher capacities together rather than pay more for a smaller-capacity, dual-actuator drive. However, Conner was able to reuse parts of the design in more conventional single-actuator models, and eventually used the dual-CPU architecture to build a line of 7200-RPM drives, the CFP4207 series, in 1995.

In the mid-1990s, just prior to their buyout by Seagate, Conner Peripherals started using a cost-saving measure on its low-end drives. Instead of bolted-down, cast aluminum lids with rubber gaskets, Conner Peripherals came up with a design that used a thinner stamped aluminum lid, and a thick adhesive tape seal along the perimeter of the lid, where the lip of the lid meets the base casting. This design used no screws to hold on the lid — just cutting the tape could permanently damage the drive by making the lid come off. This design was kept well after the Seagate buyout, and was discontinued in 1999.

Corporate history
Conner Peripherals was founded in June 1985 and located in San Jose CA.  However it did not produce any product until after it merged into and with CoData, Boulder CO, in February 1986.  It began shipping its first products based upon the CoData design in early 1987, initially to Compaq.  During calendar 1987 Compaq represented about 90% of Conner Peripheral's sales.

In 1990, Conner Peripherals set a record by reaching $1.337 billion in sales in four years, without acquisitions, making it the fastest-growing manufacturing start-up in United States history.

Conner Peripherals were also one of the first companies to produce IDE specification AV (audio/visual) hard drives for a low cost, such as the 420 megabyte AV in 1995-1996, and was the first to produce drives with a native (no external adapter) IEEE 1394 FireWire interface.

The company also started manufacturing tape drives in 1993, when it purchased Archive Corporation.

In 1996, Conner Peripherals was acquired by Seagate.

Further reading
 Pollack, Andrew. A Novel Idea: Customer Satisfaction, The New York Times, 27 May 1990, page F1.

References

Bibliography
 International Directory of Company Histories, Vol. 6; St. James Press; 1992.

External links
 Fundinguniverse.com: History of Conner Peripherals, Inc.

Seagate Technology
1985 establishments in California
1996 disestablishments in California
1996 mergers and acquisitions
American companies established in 1985
American companies disestablished in 1996
Computer companies established in 1985
Computer companies disestablished in 1996
Computer storage companies
Defunct companies based in the San Francisco Bay Area
Defunct computer companies based in California
Defunct computer companies of the United States
Defunct computer hardware companies
Hard disk drives
Manufacturing companies based in San Jose, California
Manufacturing companies established in 1985
Manufacturing companies disestablished in 1996
Technology companies based in the San Francisco Bay Area
Technology companies established in 1985
Technology companies disestablished in 1996